Pears transparent soap is a British brand of soap first produced and sold in 1807 by Andrew Pears, at a factory just off Oxford Street in London. It was the world's first mass-market translucent soap. Under the stewardship of advertising pioneer Thomas J. Barratt, A. & F. Pears initiated a number of innovations in sales and marketing. English actress and socialite Lillie Langtry was recruited to become the poster-girl for Pears in 1882, and in doing so she became the first celebrity to endorse a commercial product.

Lever Brothers, now Unilever, acquired A. & F. Pears in 1917. Products under the Pears brand are currently manufactured in India and Saudi Arabia for global distribution.

History

Andrew Pears, the son of a farmer, was born around 1770 in Cornwall and moved from his native Mevagissey to London around 1787. He completed his apprenticeship in 1789, established a barber's shop in Gerrard Street in Soho and began to produce cosmetic products. At that time, Soho was a high-end residential area, and Pears' clientele included many wealthy socialites who took pride in their appearance. The fashion among the wealthy of the period was to have pristine white complexions; tanned faces were associated with those who laboured outdoors. Pears found that his powders and creams were frequently being used to cover up damage caused by the harshness of the soaps and other beauty products that were in general use at the time, many of which contained arsenic or lead. Pears began to experiment with soap purification and eventually managed to produce a gentle soap based on glycerine and other natural products. The clarity of the soap gave it a novel transparent appearance, which provided a marketing advantage. To add to the appeal, Pears gave the soap an aroma reminiscent of an English garden. It was first sold in London in 1807.

In 1835, when his grandson, Francis Pears, joined the business, the firm was renamed A & F Pears. After three years, Andrew retired and left Francis in charge. At the Great Exhibition of 1851, A & F Pears was awarded the prize medal for soap. Production moved to Isleworth in 1862. 23-year-old Thomas J. Barratt, sometimes referred to as the father of modern advertising, was appointed bookkeeper in 1864. The next year, Francis' son, Andrew, joined A. & F. Pears as joint proprietor, and ran the Isleworth factory. That same year, Thomas married Mary Pears, Francis's eldest daughter, and was appointed to run the administration in London. During the nineteenth century, Pears built a large market for its soap in the United States.

Following Barratt's death in April 1914, Lever Brothers took a major shareholding in A & F Pears. The takeover process was completed in 1920 and marketing and other secondary functions moved to Port Sunlight in north-west England, but production continued at Isleworth.

In the mid to late 1950s, each batch of soap, about 12 a day, was tested to ensure the absence of excess alkali or free fatty acid. Production moved to Port Sunlight in the 1960s, when Unilever, successor to Lever Brothers, set up a cosmetic development laboratory on the Isleworth site. A major fire at the site completely destroyed the original factory.

Pears soap is now made in India by Hindustan Unilever, a company in which Unilever now has a 67 percent share.

Manufacture

Pears soap was made using a process entirely different from that for other soaps. A mixture of tallow and other fats was saponified by an alkali. Clearly, this is currently caustic soda (sodium hydroxide), since the ingredients list shows sodium salts of fatty acids, but a chemist reports that in the 1960s, caustic potash (potassium hydroxide) was used. It has not been possible to determine what was used in the early days of the product, as the writings of Francis Pears mention only alkali in industrial methylated spirits. After saponification was completed, the resulting glycerol was left in the batch. Batches were made not in huge pans, but in small kettle-like vessels. As soon as the translucent amber liquid had cooled enough to solidify, it was extruded into opaque oval bars that were cut into bath- or toilet-weight tablets, ready for beginning their long spell in the drying rooms (ovens). The hot liquid soap fresh from the vessel had a total fatty matter (TFM) of 45% compared with the TFMs of 70–80% usual in soaps made by the conventional method. The TFM increased considerably as the alcohol content fell during drying. The concave shape of the soap is formed by shrinkage while the soap is drying, and is not due to deliberate moulding.

The entire Pears plant was a small almost self-contained annexe at the rear of the administration block. It was run by a handful of staff, who not only had experience of the specialised process, but had developed immunity to the effects of breathing the alcohol-laden atmosphere in the building. Bars of soap produced in the factory come in two sizes: 75 g and 125 g. Nowadays the soap comes in three colours: the classic amber, green, and mint (blue colour). Each variety has a unique aroma. The soap now comes in two new sizes: 69 g and 119 g.

Marketing
The first of the famous Pears soap marketing campaigns used Giovanni Focardi's most well-known statue, You dirty boy!, exhibited at the Exposition Universelle de Paris in 1878. The statue was so popular that Pears purchased the rights to produce copies as advertisements for its soap products. The statues were in terracotta, plaster and metal, and were used in shop counter displays.

From the late 19th century, Pears soap became famous for its marketing, masterminded by Barratt. Its campaign using John Everett Millais' painting Bubbles continued over many decades. As with many other brands at the time, at the beginning of the 20th century, Pears also used its product as a sign of the prevailing European concept of the "civilizing mission" of empire and trade, in which the soap stood for progress.

In the late 19th century, to publicise its products, Pears distributed coins countermarked with "Pears Soap". They were 10-centime French coins, imported by Pears. About the same size and shape as the British penny of the time, the French coins were generally accepted as pennies in Britain.

Lillie Langtry became the first woman to endorse a commercial product, when her famous ivory complexion gained her a contract to advertise Pears soap. Her fee was related to her weight, so it was said that she was paid "pound for pound".

Between 1891 and 1925, Pears issued its now-famous annuals, which are highly collectible. From the early 20th century, Pears was famous for the annual "Miss Pears" competition, in which parents entered their children into the high-profile hunt for a young brand ambassador to be used on packaging and in consumer promotions. Many Miss Pears subsequently entered acting or modelling.

Pears' Cyclopaedia is a one volume encyclopaedia, continuously published in the United Kingdom since December 1897.

Beginning with 2003, a British company called Cert Brands took charge of the marketing and distribution of Pears soap.

Gallery

The formula

Historical overview 

Pears' unique manufacturing process required the soap to be dried for up to thirteen weeks so that the alcohol used in the process could evaporate and be re-used. The soap bars were laid out on wooden trays in drying rooms known as "ovens" about the size of a domestic garage. Bars were placed on trays with both sides open to the air. Ovens were graded in warmth from around 70F (21C) to 100F (39C). As drying proceeded trolleys loaded with trays were moved to progressively warmer ovens. In practice the soap often became opaque. Unilever explored options to prevent this, all of which would have added to the cost:

 rotating the trays periodically so that those at the top were moved to the bottom;
 adding large paddle wheels to circulate the air better;
 completely re-duct the way in which the warm air entered the ovens to achieve the same effect.

2003 change 
On 27 February 2003 the 7th Amendment to the EU Cosmetics Directive (Directive 2003/15/EC) introduced a new legal requirement related to the labelling of 26 specific ingredients if present in a cosmetic product above the following concentration thresholds: 0.001% (10 mg/kg) for leave-on products and 0.01% (100 mg/kg) for rinse-off products.

The labelling requirement is linked to the presence of the substance in concentrations higher than the above-mentioned thresholds, irrespective of the substance’s function and irrespective of its source (i.e., whether added as such or as a component of a complex cosmetic ingredient such as botanical extracts, essential oils, fragrance compositions, aroma composition etc.).

Unilever was required to list those of the 26 specific ingredients that were in Pears in concentrations greater than 0.01%. Benzyl benzoate, Cinnamal, Eugenol, Limonene and Linalool were included in the labelling because they are among the ingredients covered by Directive 2003/15/EC. It is therefore possible that they were components of the original formula, rather than newly added ingredients.

2009 change 

In October 2009, the formula for the transparent amber soap was altered from the original to become 'Gentle Care' and wrapped in an inner cellophane covering. The new soap was slightly softer in texture and lasted half as long, but its most noticeable difference was its scent. The aroma of the classic transparent amber bar, which used to be characterized by a mild, spicy herbal fragrance, had been altered to a stronger aromatic scent. The "Hypoallergenic, non-comedogenic" claim was dropped, and the 3-month aging process described on the original box does not appear on the box of the 'Gentle Care' formula.

On 6 January 2010, after a Facebook campaign, it was reported in the media that Pears planned to abandon the new formula and that by March 2010 a new version would be available that is "much closer to the original". On 8 January 2010, it was reported in the media that Pears would not abandon the new formula but "make further improvements, by delivering a scent that more closely resembles" the original formula.

2016 relaunch
The Pears Web site announces "2016 — The beloved British Icon
Returns – Pears is re-launched in UK".

Home makers of soap have made soaps using the original eight components of Pears soap.

Comparison of the historical formulas 

 The information in the table below needs to be verified. The dates in particular need documented support. Also, the information may need to be expanded as there are at least four ingredient listings known to exist for Pears soap in recent years.

An analysis of the current ingredients list reveals items such as limonene, whose variant called limonene is characterised by a "turpentine-like odour" also typical of frankincense. It is an insecticide as well. However, this item was present in the pre-2009 formula, so the perceived change might be explained by different ingredients and by different proportions of ingredients.

The latest 2009 modification mainly breaks down to an addition of artificial colouring and substances whose hypothetical function is either as detergents (i.e., cleaning substances) or stabilisers (i.e., product longevity enhancers). However, even the pre-2009 formula was a far cry from the original one. The latter was completely free of industrial cleaners, free of synthetic colours and (apparently) free of synthetic odorants, whose place was occupied by natural herbal fragrances. However, one unknown in the original formula is the "Pears fragrance essence": because of it, the customer cannot be certain whether the "new" fragrant compounds are indeed all new—or simply formerly unlisted items.

During production at Port Sunlight the glycerol (glycerine) content was a result of not removing that formed during the manufacturing process.

See also 
Pears' Cyclopaedia, founded and formerly published by Pears

Notes

References

External links

The Pharmaceutical Journal, A short history of soap (1999)
Guardian article about the 2009 formula change

English brands
Soap brands
1807 introductions
Unilever brands
British Royal Warrant holders